The 1973–74 Phoenix Suns season was the sixth for the Phoenix Suns of the National Basketball Association. It was the first of 14 seasons head coach John MacLeod spent with Phoenix. The season would also be the last for former All-Star forward/center Connie Hawkins, traded to the Los Angeles Lakers after appearing in nine games for the Suns. Charlie Scott would repeat as an All-Star, but who missed 30 games due to injury despite his NBA career-high 25.4 points a game. The team went on to finish the season 30–52, a career-worst for MacLeod and the franchise's poorest record since their inaugural season.

Dick Van Arsdale averaged 17.8 points on the season, while Neal Walk averaged 16.8 points and a team-high 10.2 rebounds per contest. Keith Erickson, obtained by the Suns along with a future second round pick in the Hawkins trade, enjoyed a career-high 14.6 points a game in his ninth year in the NBA and first with Phoenix.

Van Arsdale was named to the NBA All-Defensive Second Team, while Mike Bantom, a rookie out of Saint Joseph's, was named to the All-Rookie Team.

Offseason

NBA Draft

Roster
{| class="toccolours" style="font-size: 85%; width: 100%;"
|-
! colspan="2" style="background-color: #423189;  color: #FF8800; text-align: center;" | Phoenix Suns roster
|- style="background-color: #FF8800; color: #423189;   text-align: center;"
! Players !! Coaches
|-
| valign="top" |
{| class="sortable" style="background:transparent; margin:0px; width:100%;"
! Pos. !! # !! Nat. !! Name !! Height !! Weight !! DOB (Y-M-D) !! From
|-

Regular season

Standings

Record vs. opponents

Game log

!!Streak
|-
|- align="center" bgcolor="#ccffcc"
| 1
| October 10
| Seattle
| W 115–111
| Charlie Scott (26)
| Arizona Veterans Memorial Coliseum8,738
| 1–0
| W 1
|- align="center" bgcolor="#ffcccc"
| 2
| October 12
| Milwaukee
| L 84–107
| Lamar Green (14)
| Arizona Veterans Memorial Coliseum9,033
| 1–1
| L 1
|- align="center" bgcolor="#ffcccc"
| 3
| October 14
| Golden State
| L 95–120
| Charlie Scott (19)
| Arizona Veterans Memorial Coliseum7,030
| 1–2
| L 2
|- align="center" bgcolor="#ccffcc"
| 4
| October 20
| Atlanta
| W 118–108
| Dick Van Arsdale (37)
| Arizona Veterans Memorial Coliseum8,009
| 2–2
| W 1
|- align="center" bgcolor="#ffcccc"
| 5
| October 21
| @ Seattle
| L 112–116
| Charlie Scott (25)
| Seattle Center Coliseum11,964
| 2–3
| L 1
|- align="center" bgcolor="#ffcccc"
| 6
| October 23
| @ Golden State
| L 109–121
| Charlie Scott,Dick Van Arsdale (23)
| Oakland–Alameda County Coliseum Arena3,007
| 2–4
| L 2
|- align="center" bgcolor="#ffcccc"
| 7
| October 24
| Detroit
| L 99–115
| Mike Bantom (22)
| Arizona Veterans Memorial Coliseum6,307
| 2–5
| L 3
|- align="center" bgcolor="#ffcccc"
| 8
| October 26
| @ Kansas City-Omaha
| L 93–98
| Charlie Scott (26)
| Municipal Auditorium4,917
| 2–6
| L 4
|- align="center" bgcolor="#ffcccc"
| 9
| October 27
| @ Milwaukee
| L 95–104
|
| Milwaukee Arena9,975
| 2–7
| L 5
|- align="center" bgcolor="#ffcccc"
| 10
| October 30
| @ Atlanta
| L 101–122
| Joe Reaves (21)
| Omni Coliseum9,070
| 2–8
| L 6
|-
!!Streak
|-
|- align="center" bgcolor="#ffcccc"
| 11
| November 2
| @ Detroit
| L 107–114
| Charlie Scott (30)
| Cobo Arena5,317
| 2–9
| L 7
|- align="center" bgcolor="#ffcccc"
| 12
| November 4
| @ Capital
| L 99–102
| Dick Van Arsdale,Neal Walk (19)
| Capital Centre5,316
| 2–10
| L 8
|- align="center" bgcolor="#ffcccc"
| 13
| November 7
| @ Philadelphia
| L 115–122
| Charlie Scott (31)
| The Spectrum4,366
| 2–11
| L 9
|- align="center" bgcolor="#ffcccc"
| 14
| November 9
| @ Boston
| L 107–122
| Charlie Scott (24)
| Boston Garden9,953
| 2–12
| L 10
|- align="center" bgcolor="#ccffcc"
| 15
| November 13
| Chicago
| W 116–108
| Charlie Scott (38)
| Arizona Veterans Memorial Coliseum6,045
| 3–12
| W 1
|- align="center" bgcolor="#ccffcc"
| 16
| November 15
| Philadelphia
| W 116–94
| Charlie Scott (33)
| Arizona Veterans Memorial Coliseum6,142
| 4–12
| W 2
|- align="center" bgcolor="#ffcccc"
| 17
| November 17
| Los Angeles
| L 110–130
| Charlie Scott (30)
| Arizona Veterans Memorial Coliseum11,498
| 4–13
| L 1
|- align="center" bgcolor="#ffcccc"
| 18
| November 20
| @ Buffalo
| L 100–127
| Dick Van Arsdale (23)
| Buffalo Memorial Auditorium6,088
| 4–14
| L 2
|- align="center" bgcolor="#ffcccc"
| 19
| November 21
| @ Detroit
| L 104–107
| Charlie Scott,Neal Walk (32)
| Cobo Arena3,534
| 4–15
| L 3
|- align="center" bgcolor="#ccffcc"
| 20
| November 23
| @ Chicago
| W 99–94
| Charlie Scott (30)
| Chicago Stadium8,742
| 5–15
| W 1
|- align="center" bgcolor="#ffcccc"
| 21
| November 27
| @ Houston
| L 111–125
| Dick Van Arsdale (27)
| Hofheinz Pavilion2,756
| 5–16
| L 1
|- align="center" bgcolor="#ccffcc"
| 22
| November 29
| Kansas City-Omaha
| W 119–99
| Mike Bantom (26)
| Arizona Veterans Memorial Coliseum6,386
| 6–16
| W 1
|- align="center" bgcolor="#ccffcc"
| 23
| November 30
| @ Portland
| W 107–99
| Clem Haskins (36)
| Memorial Coliseum10,720
| 7–16
| W 2
|-
!!Streak
|-
|- align="center" bgcolor="#ffcccc"
| 24
| December 1
| Detroit
| L 109–121
| Dick Van Arsdale (21)
| Arizona Veterans Memorial Coliseum6,496
| 7–17
| L 1
|- align="center" bgcolor="#ffcccc"
| 25
| December 4
| @ Los Angeles
| L 103–120
| Charlie Scott (23)
| The Forum11,746
| 7–18
| L 2
|- align="center" bgcolor="#ccffcc"
| 26
| December 5
| Golden State
| W 103–97
| Charlie Scott (27)
| Arizona Veterans Memorial Coliseum5,553
| 8–18
| W 1
|- align="center" bgcolor="#ccffcc"
| 27
| December 7
| Capital
| W 114–92
| Charlie Scott (40)
| Arizona Veterans Memorial Coliseum6,089
| 9–18
| W 2
|- align="center" bgcolor="#ccffcc"
| 28
| December 9
| @ Cleveland
| W 117–106
| Charlie Scott (31)
| Cleveland Arena3,042
| 10–18
| W 3
|- align="center" bgcolor="#ffcccc"
| 29
| December 11
| @ New York
| L 97–105
| Dick Van Arsdale (23)
| Madison Square Garden18,366
| 10–19
| L 1
|- align="center" bgcolor="#ffcccc"
| 30
| December 13
| Portland
| L 108–119
| Charlie Scott (32)
| Arizona Veterans Memorial Coliseum5,494
| 10–20
| L 2
|- align="center" bgcolor="#ccffcc"
| 31
| December 15
| Boston
| W 121–120
| Charlie Scott (41)
| Arizona Veterans Memorial Coliseum7,362
| 11–20
| W 1
|- align="center" bgcolor="#ccffcc"
| 32
| December 16
| @ Seattle
| W 113–109
| Charlie Scott (38)
| Seattle Center Coliseum9,778
| 12–20
| W 2
|- align="center" bgcolor="#ffcccc"
| 33
| December 18
| @ Portland
| L 117–133
| Dick Van Arsdale (26)
| Memorial Coliseum5,982
| 12–21
| L 1
|- align="center" bgcolor="#ffcccc"
| 34
| December 19
| Philadelphia
| L 98–101
| Charlie Scott (44)
| Arizona Veterans Memorial Coliseum5,246
| 12–22
| L 2
|- align="center" bgcolor="#ccffcc"
| 35
| December 22
| Milwaukee
| W 121–112
| Charlie Scott (31)
| Arizona Veterans Memorial Coliseum8,013
| 13–22
| W 1
|- align="center" bgcolor="#ccffcc"
| 36
| December 25
| Los Angeles
| W 135–100
| Charlie Scott (27)
| Arizona Veterans Memorial Coliseum9,253
| 14–22
| W 2
|- align="center" bgcolor="#ccffcc"
| 37
| December 27
| Seattle
| W 111–100
| Charlie Scott (33)
| Arizona Veterans Memorial Coliseum7,755
| 15–22
| W 3
|- align="center" bgcolor="#ffcccc"
| 38
| December 28
| @ Los Angeles
| L 107–119
| Charlie Scott (29)
| The Forum13,685
| 15–23
| L 1
|- align="center" bgcolor="#ffcccc"
| 39
| December 29
| Buffalo
| L 108–120
| Charlie Scott (30)
| Arizona Veterans Memorial Coliseum9,116
| 15–24
| L 2
|-
!!Streak
|-
|- align="center" bgcolor="#ccffcc"
| 40
| January 2
| @ Atlanta
| W 116–113
| Dick Van Arsdale (28)
| Omni Coliseum9,232
| 16–24
| W 1
|- align="center" bgcolor="#ffcccc"
| 41
| January 4
| @ Kansas City-Omaha
| L 97–122
| Charlie Scott (28)
| Municipal Auditorium4,837
| 16–25
| L 1
|- align="center" bgcolor="#ffcccc"
| 42
| January 5
| @ Milwaukee
| L 109–118
| Dick Van Arsdale (22)
| Milwaukee Arena9,812
| 16–26
| L 2
|- align="center" bgcolor="#ffcccc"
| 43
| January 6
| @ Chicago
| L 116–120 (OT)
| Charlie Scott (30)
| Chicago Stadium6,013
| 16–27
| L 3
|- align="center" bgcolor="#ccffcc"
| 44
| January 9
| Houston
| W 105–101
| Charlie Scott (19)
| Arizona Veterans Memorial Coliseum5,924
| 17–27
| W 1
|- align="center" bgcolor="#ffcccc"
| 45
| January 11
| Kansas City-Omaha
| L 100–117
| Charlie Scott (24)
| Arizona Veterans Memorial Coliseum6,747
| 17–28
| L 1
|- align="center" bgcolor="#ffcccc"
| 46
| January 13
| Seattle
| L 112–123
| Neal Walk (28)
| Arizona Veterans Memorial Coliseum5,769
| 17–29
| L 2
|- align="center"
|colspan="9" bgcolor="#bbcaff"|All-Star Break
|- align="center" bgcolor="#ffcccc"
| 47
| January 17
| @ Golden State
| L 120–127
| Charlie Scott (31)
| Oakland–Alameda County Coliseum Arena3,011
| 17–30
| L 3
|- align="center" bgcolor="#ccffcc"
| 48
| January 19
| New York
| W 112–89
| Charlie Scott (26)
| Arizona Veterans Memorial Coliseum9,468
| 18–30
| W 1
|- align="center" bgcolor="#ccffcc"
| 49
| January 23
| Cleveland
| W 110–103
| Charlie Scott (25)
| Arizona Veterans Memorial Coliseum5,017
| 19–30
| W 2
|- align="center" bgcolor="#ffcccc"
| 50
| January 25
| Milwaukee
| L 108–112
| Charlie Scott (29)
| Arizona Veterans Memorial Coliseum7,660
| 19–31
| L 1
|- align="center" bgcolor="#ccffcc"
| 51
| January 27
| Capital
| W 127–107
| Keith Erickson (28)
| Arizona Veterans Memorial Coliseum5,277
| 20–31
| W 1
|- align="center" bgcolor="#ccffcc"
| 52
| January 31
| Portland
| W 112–100
| Charlie Scott (25)
| Arizona Veterans Memorial Coliseum5,252
| 21–31
| W 2
|-
!!Streak
|-
|- align="center" bgcolor="#ffcccc"
| 53
| February 1
| @ Los Angeles
| L 110–121
| Gary Melchionni,Dick Van Arsdale (20)
| The Forum13,478
| 21–32
| L 1
|- align="center" bgcolor="#ccffcc"
| 54
| February 2
| Los Angeles
| W 119–112
| Dick Van Arsdale,Neal Walk (25)
| Arizona Veterans Memorial Coliseum8,068
| 22–32
| W 1
|- align="center" bgcolor="#ffcccc"
| 55
| February 5
| @ New York
| L 90–106
| Dick Van Arsdale (27)
| Madison Square Garden18,884
| 22–33
| L 1
|- align="center" bgcolor="#ffcccc"
| 56
| February 6
| @ Capital
| L 101–109
| Clem Haskins (23)
| Capital Centre6,738
| 22–34
| L 2
|- align="center" bgcolor="#ffcccc"
| 57
| February 8
| Detroit
| L 94–99
| Dick Van Arsdale (18)
| Arizona Veterans Memorial Coliseum8,511
| 22–35
| L 3
|- align="center" bgcolor="#ffcccc"
| 58
| February 10
| Golden State
| L 105–121
| Bob Christian (21)
| Arizona Veterans Memorial Coliseum5,121
| 22–36
| L 4
|- align="center" bgcolor="#ffcccc"
| 59
| February 12
| @ Portland
| L 104–113
| Keith Erickson (24)
| Memorial Coliseum4,189
| 22–37
| L 5
|- align="center" bgcolor="#ccffcc"
| 60
| February 14
| Houston
| W 107–99
| Dick Van Arsdale (24)
| Arizona Veterans Memorial Coliseum5,661
| 23–37
| W 1
|- align="center" bgcolor="#ccffcc"
| 61
| February 16
| Atlanta
| W 124–123 (OT)
| Neal Walk (29)
| Arizona Veterans Memorial Coliseum8,518
| 24–37
| W 2
|- align="center" bgcolor="#ccffcc"
| 62
| February 17
| Portland
| W 112–100
| Mike Bantom (22)
| Arizona Veterans Memorial Coliseum5,575
| 25–37
| W 3
|- align="center" bgcolor="#ffcccc"
| 63
| February 19
| @ Chicago
| L 96–130
| Dick Van Arsdale (20)
| Chicago Stadium7,451
| 25–38
| L 1
|- align="center" bgcolor="#ffcccc"
| 64
| February 22
| @ Kansas-City Omaha
| L 104–119
| Keith Erickson (23)
| Municipal Auditorium8,322
| 25–39
| L 2
|- align="center" bgcolor="#ffcccc"
| 65
| February 23
| @ Detroit
| L 107–119
| Dick Van Arsdale (18)
| Cobo Arena7,926
| 25–40
| L 3
|- align="center" bgcolor="#ffcccc"
| 66
| February 24
| @ Cleveland
| L 97–101
| Keith Erickson,Neal Walk (22)
| Cleveland Arena3,288
| 25–41
| L 4
|- align="center" bgcolor="#ffcccc"
| 67
| February 26
| @ Golden State
| L 100–120
| Clem Haskins (31)
| Oakland–Alameda County Coliseum Arena3,234
| 25–42
| L 5
|- align="center" bgcolor="#ffcccc"
| 68
| February 27
| Chicago
| L 95–107
| Keith Erickson (34)
| Arizona Veterans Memorial Coliseum5,105
| 25–43
| L 6
|-
!!Streak
|-
|- align="center" bgcolor="#ffcccc"
| 69
| March 1
| @ Houston
| L 111–117
| Keith Erickson (23)
| Hofheinz Pavilion2,547
| 25–44
| L 7
|- align="center" bgcolor="#ccffcc"
| 70
| March 3
| Kansas City-Omaha
| W 113–100
| Dick Van Arsdale,Neal Walk (23)
| Arizona Veterans Memorial Coliseum4,780
| 26–44
| W 1
|- align="center" bgcolor="#ffcccc"
| 71
| March 5
| Chicago
| L 91–111
| Neal Walk (21)
| Arizona Veterans Memorial Coliseum6,156
| 26–45
| L 1
|- align="center" bgcolor="#ffcccc"
| 72
| March 7
| Boston
| L 97–99
| Gary Melchionni (23)
| Arizona Veterans Memorial Coliseum6,242
| 26–46
| L 2
|- align="center" bgcolor="#ccffcc"
| 73
| March 9
| Cleveland
| W 109–100
| Dick Van Arsdale (26)
| Arizona Veterans Memorial Coliseum6,153
| 27–46
| W 1
|- align="center" bgcolor="#ffcccc"
| 74
| March 11
| @ Milwaukee
| L 92–105
| Neal Walk (20)
| Milwaukee Arena9,027
| 27–47
| L 1
|- align="center" bgcolor="#ffcccc"
| 75
| March 12
| @ Buffalo
| L 94–124
| Keith Erickson (20)
| Buffalo Memorial Auditorium14,244
| 27–48
| L 2
|- align="center" bgcolor="#ffcccc"
| 76
| March 13
| @ Boston
| L 97–104
| Corky Calhoun,Keith Erickson,Dick Van Arsdale (15)
| Boston Garden6,751
| 27–49
| L 3
|- align="center" bgcolor="#ffcccc"
| 77
| March 15
| @ Philadelphia
| L 101–108
| Keith Erickson (24)
| Hershey, PA4,473
| 27–50
| L 4
|- align="center" bgcolor="#ccffcc"
| 78
| March 17
| @ Seattle
| W 133–108
| Keith Erickson (30)
| Seattle Center Coliseum13,007
| 28–50
| W 1
|- align="center" bgcolor="#ffcccc"
| 79
| March 20
| New York
| L 104–106 (OT)
| Keith Erickson,Neal Walk (18)
| Arizona Veterans Memorial Coliseum8,054
| 28–51
| L 1
|- align="center" bgcolor="#ccffcc"
| 80
| March 22
| Buffalo
| W 126–119
| Mike Bantom,Clem Haskins,Gary Melchionni (22)
| Arizona Veterans Memorial Coliseum8,687
| 29–51
| W 1
|- align="center" bgcolor="#ccffcc"
| 81
| March 24
| Golden State
| W 134–121
| Keith Erickson (40)
| Arizona Veterans Memorial Coliseum7,011
| 30–51
| W 2
|- align="center" bgcolor="#ffcccc"
| 82
| March 27
| @ Seattle
| L 123–127
| Clem Haskins (28)
| Seattle Center Coliseum12,528
| 30–52
| L 1
|-

Awards and honors

All-Star
 Charlie Scott was selected to replace Jerry West in the All-Star Game. It was his second consecutive All-Star selection.

Season
 Dick Van Arsdale was named to the NBA All-Defensive Second Team.
 Mike Bantom was named to the NBA All-Rookie First Team.

Player statistics

Season

* – Stats with the Suns.
† – Minimum 560 field goal attempts.
^ – Minimum 160 free throw attempts.
+ – Minimum 70 games played.

Transactions

Trades

Free agents

Subtractions

References
 Standings on Basketball Reference

Phoenix
Phoenix Suns seasons